Azertyuiop may refer to:
the first letters row of the AZERTY, the French and Belgian keyboard layout 
Azertyuiop (horse), a top-class 2 mile National Hunt steeplechase horse